Arizona State Sun Devils    

Ryan DuWayne Bader (born June 7, 1983) is an American mixed martial artist currently signed to Bellator MMA where he is the current Bellator Heavyweight Champion, the former Bellator Light Heavyweight Champion, and the winner of the 2018 Bellator Heavyweight World Grand Prix Tournament. At Bellator 214, Bader became the first fighter in Bellator history to become champion in two weight divisions simultaneously. Prior to signing with Bellator, Bader competed for the Ultimate Fighting Championship (UFC) in the Light Heavyweight division and he was a cast member and winner of The Ultimate Fighter: Team Nogueira vs. Team Mir. As of March 14, 2023, he is #7 in the Bellator men's pound-for-pound rankings.

Background and career
Ryan Bader was born in Reno, Nevada and started wrestling at the age of seven. He entered mixed martial arts after a successful career in amateur wrestling. He attended Robert McQueen High School where he won two state championships and was ranked as high as fourth in the country for wrestling. In football, Bader was the 2001 Nevada Defensive Player of the Year and helped the McQueen Lancers win the Nevada state championship title. Bader ultimately attended Arizona State University on a wrestling scholarship, where he was college teammates with former UFC Heavyweight Champion Cain Velasquez and CB Dollaway. While attending ASU, Bader was a three-time Pac-10 Champion, winning titles in 2003, 2004, and 2006. He was also a two-time All-American, placing fourth in 2004 as a sophomore and seventh in 2006 as a senior at the NCAA national tournament. He began training at Arizona Combat Sports in early 2007.

The Ultimate Fighter (2008)
Bader's UFC career began as a contestant on season 8 of The Ultimate Fighter. Bader, the first light heavyweight selected by coach Antônio Rodrigo Nogueira, went on to win his first three fights on the show to fight with Vinicius Magalhães on December 13, 2008, at The Ultimate Fighter 8 Finale.

At the finale, Bader defeated Magalhães by way of a quick, first-round knockout, earning the title of "The Ultimate Fighter" and winning the traditional "six-figure UFC contract". An overhand right dropped Magalhães, and Bader followed up with strikes on the ground to take the win, less than halfway through the first round.

Ultimate Fighting Championship (2009–2011)
Bader's first post-TUF fight was at UFC Fight Night 18 against Carmelo Marrero, whom he defeated via unanimous decision, scoring 30–27 on all three judges' scorecards. During the match, Bader tore his medial collateral ligament and posterior cruciate ligament, which kept him sidelined until the next fall.

Shortly after the Marrero fight, Bader appeared alongside fellow Ultimate Fighter 8 winner Efrain Escudero in the UFC's sixth video game, UFC 2009 Undisputed. He and Escudero were available through a special code obtained by pre-ordering the game from GameStop. On September 10, 2009, he and Escudero were made available for download on PlayStation Network and Xbox 360 Marketplace.

Bader returned against Eric Schafer on October 24, 2009, at UFC 104. The fight was mainly dominated by Bader, who scored with a powerful attack of combinations standing and controlled the grappling, en route a unanimous decision victory (30–27, 29–26, and 30–27).

Next for Bader was Keith Jardine, who he fought on February 21, 2010, at the UFC's debut effort in Australia, UFC 110. Bader scored a sharp jab on the tiring Jardine, which set up a flying knee to the chest and a left hook at 2:10 of the third round to secure a KO victory for Bader.

Along with Jesse Forbes, CB Dollaway, Eric Larkin and Aaron Simpson, Bader left Arizona Combat Sports to train at their newly opened gym Power MMA And Fitness.

Bader moved his UFC record to 5–0 at the expense of Antônio Rogério Nogueira at UFC 119, controlling him most of the fight with his wrestling and using his jab and short combinations to stop much of Nogueira's offense. All three judges scored the fight 30–27 for Bader.

First MMA losses (2011–2013)
Four months after his victory over Nogueira, Bader fought fellow rising prospect Jon Jones on February 5, 2011, at UFC 126, where he received the first loss of his MMA career after tapping out to a modified guillotine choke in the second round.

In a massive upset, Bader lost to Tito Ortiz on July 2, 2011, at UFC 132 by an arm-in guillotine choke which Ortiz secured following a knockdown of Bader.

Bader then faced Jason Brilz on November 19, 2011, at UFC 139. He defeated Brilz at 1:17 of the first round via KO, landing a straight right behind Brilz's ear causing him to immediately fall to the mat face-first.

Bader next faced former Light Heavyweight champion Quinton Jackson on February 26, 2012, at UFC 144. Jackson weighed in over the Light Heavyweight weight allowance of 206 lbs by 5 lbs, weighing in at 211 lbs. Bader accepted the fight at a catchweight and received 20% of Jackson's purse. Bader won via unanimous decision, with all three judges scoring the fight 30–27.

Bader faced Lyoto Machida on August 4, 2012, at UFC on Fox: Shogun vs. Vera. He was defeated via KO at 1:32 in the second round, after rushing in and being caught with a punch.

Bader faced former title challenger Vladimir Matyushenko on January 26, 2013, at UFC on Fox 6. He won the fight via guillotine choke submission at just 50 seconds of the first round, earning his first Submission of the Night honors, and also having the fastest UFC Light Heavyweight submission.

Bader was expected to face Glover Teixeira on May 25, 2013, at UFC 160. However, Bader pulled out of the bout citing an injury and was replaced by James Te-Huna.

The bout with Teixeira eventually took place on September 4, 2013, in the main event at UFC Fight Night 28. Despite dropping Teixeira early in the first round, Bader lost the fight via TKO in the first round.

Bader faced Anthony Perosh on December 7, 2013, at UFC Fight Night 33. He won the fight via unanimous decision (30–27, 30–27, and 30–26). Bader dominated Perosh all 15 minutes of the three round contest using his superior wrestling.

Winning streaks at UFC (2014–2016)
Bader faced Rafael Cavalcante on June 14, 2014, at UFC 174. He won the fight via unanimous decision. Bader's wrestling was displayed once again, controlling Feijão the majority of the bout.

Bader faced Ovince St. Preux on August 16, 2014, at UFC Fight Night: Bader vs. St. Preux. He won the fight via unanimous decision.

Bader fought Phil Davis on January 24, 2015, at UFC on Fox 14. He won the fight by split decision.

Bader was expected to face Daniel Cormier on June 6, 2015, at UFC Fight Night 68. However, on April 28, 2015 it was announced that Cormier had been removed from the fight in favor of a matchup with Anthony Johnson on May 23, 2015 at UFC 187.

Bader faced Rashad Evans on October 3, 2015, at UFC 192. He won the fight via unanimous decision.

Bader faced Anthony Johnson in the main event on January 30, 2016, at UFC on Fox 18. His winning streak was interrupted, as he lost the fight via knockout in the first round.

Bader next faced Ilir Latifi on September 3, 2016, at UFC Fight Night 93. He won the fight via knockout in the second round and was awarded a Performance of the Night bonus.

Bader faced Antônio Rogério Nogueira in a rematch on November 19, 2016, in the main event at UFC Fight Night 100. He won the fight by TKO in the third round with ground and pound after dominating Nogueira on the mat. Bader's fight against Nogueira was the last on his UFC contract and afterward he was a free agent.

Bellator MMA (2017–present)

Double champion (2017–2020)
On Ariel Helwani's podcast, the MMA Hour, Bader stated that he has a Bellator MMA contract on hand, that negotiations are in process, and that the UFC has the right to match the Bellator offer. If the UFC chose not to match then his desire would be for an immediate fight against the current Bellator Light Heavyweight Champion Phil Davis, whom he had beaten in the UFC. On March 21, 2017, Bader announced that the UFC had not sought to match Bellator's offer and that he had officially signed a six-fight deal with Bellator MMA.

Bader was officially unveiled as a fighter for the company at Bellator 175. After the main event, Bader entered the cage and it was announced he would face Muhammed Lawal at Bellator 180 on June 24, 2017. However, Lawal pulled out of the fight and Bader faced Bellator Light Heavyweight champion Phil Davis in a rematch. Bader and Davis first met at UFC on Fox: Gustafsson vs. Johnson on January 24, 2015, with Bader winning by split decision. Bader won the rematch again by split decision to become the new Light Heavyweight champion.

In his first title defense, Bader faced Linton Vassell at Bellator 186 on November 3, 2017. He won the fight via TKO in the second round.

Bader faced Muhammed Lawal in the Bellator Heavyweight Grand Prix for the Bellator Heavyweight championship at Bellator 199 on May 12, 2018. He won the fight via TKO 15 seconds into the first round.

Bader faced Matt Mitrione in the semi-finals at Bellator 207 on October 12, 2018. He won the fight via unanimous decision.

In the final, Bader faced Fedor Emelianenko for the vacant Bellator Heavyweight World Championship in the main event at Bellator 214 on January 26, 2019. Bader claimed the title by winning via knockout 35 seconds into the first round, thus becoming the first simultaneous two-weight champion in Bellator history.

In April 2019, Bader signed an exclusive, multi-year and six-fight contract with Bellator.

On July 11, 2019, it was announced that Bader is set to make his first heavyweight title defense against Cheick Kongo. This bout served as the headliner of Bellator 226 on September 7. The bout ended in a no contest at 3:52 of the first round when Bader landed an accidental eye poke on Kongo that rendered him unable to continue, with Bader retaining his title.

Bader was signed to defend his light heavyweight title against Vadim Nemkov at Bellator 242 on May 9, 2020. However, it was later announced that Bellator 242 and Bader's bout against Nemkov had been postponed due to the COVID-19 pandemic. The title bout with Nemkov was rescheduled and took place on August 21 at Bellator 244. Bader lost the bout via second-round technical knockout.

Light Heavyweight World Grand Prix
On February 9, 2021, it was announced that Bader would be participating in the Bellator Light Heavyweight World Grand Prix. He faced Lyoto Machida in the quarterfinal round. This was a rematch of their August 2012 bout, which saw Machida win via second-round knockout. The bout took place at Bellator 256 on April 9, 2021. After Machida showed early success in the first two rounds on the feet via kicks, Bader soon controlled the rest of the bout on the ground, winning via a unanimous decision.

In the semi-finals of the Grand Prix, Bader faced Corey Anderson on October 16, 2021 at Bellator 268. He lost the fight via technical knockout less than a minute into round one.

Heavyweight Reign 
Bader defended his Heavyweight title against Bellator Interim Heavyweight World Champion Valentin Moldavsky on January 29, 2022 at Bellator 273. He won the close bout via unanimous decision. 7 out of 11 media scores gave it to Moldavsky.

As the first bout of his new four-fight contract, Bader defended his title against Cheick Kongo on May 6, 2022 at Bellator 280. He won the fight via unanimous decision.

Bader defended his title in a rematch against Fedor Emelianenko on February 4, 2023 at Bellator 290. He won the bout via ground and pound TKO in the first round.

Personal life
Bader and his wife Daisy were married in October 2010. They have two sons and a daughter.

Championships and accomplishments

Mixed martial arts
Bellator MMA
Bellator Heavyweight World Championship (One time; current)
Three successful title defenses
Most successful consecutive heavyweight title defenses in Bellator MMA history (3)
Bellator Light Heavyweight World Championship (One time; former)
One successful title defense
Bellator MMA Heavyweight World Grand Prix winner
Second two-weight champion in Bellator MMA history
First ever simultaneous two-weight champion in Bellator MMA history
Only fighter in Bellator history to defend titles in two weight classes
Ultimate Fighting Championship
The Ultimate Fighter 8 Light Heavyweight Tournament Winner
Submission of the Night (One time) 
Performance of the Night (One time) 
Tied - 2nd most Wins in UFC Light Heavyweight history (15) with Tito Ortiz and Chuck Liddell.

Collegiate wrestling
National Collegiate Athletic Association
NCAA Division I All-American out of Arizona State University (2004), (2006)
NCAA Division I 197 lb - 4th place out of Arizona State University (2004)
NCAA Division I 197 lb - 7th place out of Arizona State University (2006)
Pac-10 Conference Championship out of Arizona State University (2003), (2004), (2006)

Mixed martial arts record

|-
|Win
|align=center|31–7 (1)
|Fedor Emelianenko
|TKO (punches)
|Bellator 290
|
|align=center|1
|align=center|2:30
|Inglewood, California, United States
|
|-
|Win
|align=center|30–7 (1)
|Cheick Kongo
|Decision (unanimous)
|Bellator 280
|
|align=center|5
|align=center|5:00
|Paris, France
|
|-
|Win
|align=center|29–7 (1)
|Valentin Moldavsky
|Decision (unanimous)
|Bellator 273
|
|align=center|5
|align=center|5:00
|Phoenix, Arizona, United States
|
|-
|Loss
|align=center|28–7 (1)
|Corey Anderson
|TKO (punches)
|Bellator 268 
|
|align=center|1
|align=center|0:51
|Phoenix, Arizona, United States 
|
|-
|Win
|align=center|28–6 (1)
|Lyoto Machida
|Decision (unanimous)
|Bellator 256 
|
|align=center|5
|align=center|5:00
|Uncasville, Connecticut, United States 
|
|-
|Loss
|align=center|27–6 (1)
|Vadim Nemkov
|TKO (head kick and punches)
|Bellator 244 
|
|align=center|2
|align=center|3:02
|Uncasville, Connecticut, United States 
|
|-
|NC
|align=center|
|Cheick Kongo
|NC (accidental eye poke)
|Bellator 226 
|
|align=center|1
|align=center|3:52
|San Jose, California, United States 
|
|-
|Win
|align=center|27–5
|Fedor Emelianenko 
|TKO (punches)
|Bellator 214
|
|align=center|1
|align=center|0:35
|Inglewood, California, United States
|
|-
| Win
| align=center|26–5
| Matt Mitrione
| Decision (unanimous)
| Bellator 207
| 
| align=center| 3
| align=center| 5:00
| Uncasville, Connecticut, United States
| 
|- 
| Win
| align=center|25–5
| Muhammed Lawal
| TKO (punches)
| Bellator 199
| 
| align=center| 1
| align=center| 0:15
| San Jose, California, United States
| 
|-
|Win
|align=center|24–5
|Linton Vassell
|TKO (punches)
|Bellator 186
|
|align=center|2
|align=center|3:58
|University Park, Pennsylvania, United States
|
|-
|Win
|align=center|23–5
|Phil Davis
|Decision (split)
|Bellator 180
|
|align=center|5
|align=center|5:00
|New York City, New York, United States
|
|-
| Win
| align=center| 22–5
| Antônio Rogério Nogueira
| TKO (punches)
| UFC Fight Night: Bader vs. Nogueira 2
| 
| align=center|3
| align=center|3:51
| São Paulo, Brazil
| 
|-
| Win
| align=center| 21–5
| Ilir Latifi
| KO (knee)
| UFC Fight Night: Arlovski vs. Barnett
| 
| align=center| 2
| align=center|2:06
| Hamburg, Germany
| 
|-
| Loss
| align=center| 20–5
| Anthony Johnson
| KO (punches)
| UFC on Fox: Johnson vs. Bader
| 
| align=center|1
| align=center|1:26
| Newark, New Jersey, United States
|
|-
|Win
| align=center| 20–4
| Rashad Evans
| Decision (unanimous)
| UFC 192
| 
| align=center|3
| align=center|5:00
| Houston, Texas, United States
|
|-
| Win
| align=center| 19–4
| Phil Davis
| Decision (split)
| UFC on Fox: Gustafsson vs. Johnson
| 
| align=center| 3
| align=center| 5:00
| Stockholm, Sweden
| 
|-
| Win
| align=center| 18–4
| Ovince Saint Preux
| Decision (unanimous)
| UFC Fight Night: Bader vs. Saint Preux
| 
| align=center| 5
| align=center| 5:00
| Bangor, Maine, United States
| 
|-
| Win
| align=center| 17–4
| Rafael Cavalcante
| Decision (unanimous)
| UFC 174
| 
| align=center| 3
| align=center| 5:00
| Vancouver, British Columbia, Canada
| 
|-
| Win
| align=center| 16–4
| Anthony Perosh
| Decision (unanimous)
| UFC Fight Night: Hunt vs. Bigfoot
| 
| align=center| 3
| align=center| 5:00
| Brisbane, Australia
| 
|-
| Loss
| align=center| 15–4
| Glover Teixeira

| TKO (punches)
| UFC Fight Night: Teixeira vs. Bader
| 
| align=center| 1
| align=center| 2:55
| Belo Horizonte, Brazil
| 
|-
| Win
| align=center| 15–3
| Vladimir Matyushenko
| Submission (guillotine choke)
| UFC on Fox: Johnson vs. Dodson
| 
| align=center| 1
| align=center| 0:50
| Chicago, Illinois, United States
| 
|-
| Loss
| align=center| 14–3
| Lyoto Machida
| KO (punch)
| UFC on Fox: Shogun vs. Vera
| 
| align=center| 2
| align=center| 1:32
| Los Angeles, California, United States
| 
|-
| Win
| align=center| 14–2
| Quinton Jackson
| Decision (unanimous)
| UFC 144
| 
| align=center| 3
| align=center| 5:00
| Saitama, Japan
| 
|-
| Win
| align=center| 13–2
| Jason Brilz
| KO (punch)
| UFC 139
| 
| align=center| 1
| align=center| 1:17
| San Jose, California, United States
| 
|-
| Loss
| align=center| 12–2
| Tito Ortiz
| Submission (guillotine choke)
| UFC 132
| 
| align=center| 1
| align=center| 1:56
| Las Vegas, Nevada, United States
| 
|-
| Loss
| align=center| 12–1
| Jon Jones
| Submission (guillotine choke)
| UFC 126
| 
| align=center| 2
| align=center| 4:20
| Las Vegas, Nevada, United States
| 
|-
| Win
| align=center| 12–0
| Antônio Rogério Nogueira
| Decision (unanimous)
| UFC 119
| 
| align=center| 3
| align=center| 5:00
| Indianapolis, Indiana, United States
| 
|-
| Win
| align=center| 11–0
| Keith Jardine
| KO (flying knee and punch)
| UFC 110
| 
| align=center| 3
| align=center| 2:10
| Sydney, Australia
| 
|-
| Win
| align=center| 10–0
| Eric Schafer
| Decision (unanimous)
| UFC 104
| 
| align=center| 3
| align=center| 5:00
| Los Angeles, California, United States
| 
|-
| Win
| align=center| 9–0
| Carmelo Marrero
| Decision (unanimous)
| UFC Fight Night: Condit vs. Kampmann
| 
| align=center| 3
| align=center| 5:00
| Nashville, Tennessee, United States
| 
|-
| Win
| align=center| 8–0
| Vinny Magalhães
| TKO (punches)
| The Ultimate Fighter: Team Nogueira vs Team Mir Finale
| 
| align=center| 1
| align=center| 2:18
| Las Vegas, Nevada, United States
| 
|-
| Win
| align=center| 7–0
| Buckley Acosta
| Submission (arm-triangle choke)
| XCC 6: Western Threat
| 
| align=center| 1
| align=center| 0:47
| Reno, Nevada, United States
| 
|-
| Win
| align=center| 6–0
| Brad Peterson
| Decision (unanimous)
| IFO: Fireworks in the Cage IV
| 
| align=center| 3
| align=center| 5:00
| Las Vegas, Nevada, United States
| 
|-
| Win
| align=center| 5–0
| Ulises Cortez
| KO (suplex and punches)
| SE: Vale Tudo
| 
| align=center| 1
| align=center| N/A
| Mexico
| 
|-
| Win
| align=center| 4–0
| Dicky Chavez
| TKO (punches)
| KOTC: Unstoppable
| 
| align=center| 1
| align=center| 0:41
| San Carlos, Arizona, United States
| 
|-
| Win
| align=center| 3–0
| Tim Peacock
| TKO (punches)
| Rage in the Cage 94
| 
| align=center| 2
| align=center| 2:50
| Camp Verde, Arizona, United States
| 
|-
| Win
| align=center| 2–0
| David Baggett
| Submission (rear-naked choke)
| Proving Grounds 1
| 
| align=center| 1
| align=center| N/A
| Cayman Islands
| 
|-
| Win
| align=center| 1–0
| Dave Covello
| TKO (submission to punches)
| Reno Combats: Inferno 2
| 
| align=center| 1
| align=center| 2:21
| Camp Verde, Arizona, United States
| 

|-
|Win
|align=center|3–0
|Eliot Marshall
|Decision (unanimous)
|rowspan=3|The Ultimate Fighter 8
| (airdate)
|align=center|2
|align=center|5:00
|rowspan=3|Las Vegas, Nevada, United States
|
|-
|Win
|align=center|2–0
|Tom Lawlor
|KO (punch)
| (airdate)
|align=center|1
|align=center|3:44
|
|-
|Win
|align=center|1–0
|Kyle Kingsbury
|Submission (arm-triangle choke)
| (airdate)
|align=center|2
|align=center|1:33
|
|-

NCAA record

! colspan="8"| NCAA Championships Matches
|-
!  Res.
!  Record
!  Opponent
!  Score
!  Date
!  Event
|-
! style=background:white colspan=6 |2006 NCAA Championships at 197 lbs
|-
|Loss
|10-7
|align=left|Joel Flaggert
|style="font-size:88%"|4-9
|style="font-size:88%" rowspan=5|March 17, 2006
|style="font-size:88%" rowspan=5|2006 NCAA Division I Wrestling Championships
|-
|Win
|10-6
|align=left|Nathan Moore
|style="font-size:88%"|6-4
|-
|Loss
|9-6
|align=left|Chris Weidman
|style="font-size:88%"|7-10
|-
|Win
|9-5
|align=left|Tyrone Byrd
|style="font-size:88%"|6-0
|-
|Win
|8-5
|align=left|Bredan McLean
|style="font-size:88%"|Fall
|-
! style=background:white colspan=6 |2005 NCAA Championships at 197 lbs
|-
|Loss
|7-5
|align=left|Joel Flaggert
|style="font-size:88%"|5-1
|style="font-size:88%" rowspan=4|March 17, 2005
|style="font-size:88%" rowspan=4|2005 NCAA Division I Wrestling Championships
|-
|Win
|7-4
|align=left|Joel Weimer
|style="font-size:88%"|3-2
|-
|Loss
|6-4
|align=left|Phil Davis
|style="font-size:88%"|1-3
|-
|Win
|6-3
|align=left|Tyrone Byrd
|style="font-size:88%"|7-3
|-
! style=background:white colspan=6 |2004 NCAA Championships 4th at 197 lbs
|-
|Win
|5-3
|align=left|Chris Skretkowicz
|style="font-size:88%"|5-1
|style="font-size:88%" rowspan=5|March 20, 2004
|style="font-size:88%" rowspan=5|2004 NCAA Division I Wrestling Championships
|-
|Loss
|4-3
|align=left|Damion Hahn
|style="font-size:88%"|1-2
|-
|Win
|4-2
|align=left|B.J. Padden
|style="font-size:88%"|5-3
|-
|Win
|3-2
|align=left|Joel Weimer
|style="font-size:88%"|4-1
|-
|Win
|2-2
|align=left|Jeff Foust
|style="font-size:88%"|7-0
|-
! style=background:white colspan=6 |2003 NCAA Championships at 197 lbs
|-
|Loss
|1-2
|align=left|Matt Greenberg
|style="font-size:88%"|Major 1-14
|style="font-size:88%" rowspan=3|March 20, 2003
|style="font-size:88%" rowspan=3|2003 NCAA Division I Wrestling Championships
|-
|Loss
|1-1
|align=left|Jon Trenge
|style="font-size:88%"|Major 2-11
|-
|Win
|1-0
|align=left|Adam Schaaf
|style="font-size:88%"|OT 6-4
|-

See also
List of current Bellator fighters
List of male mixed martial artists

References

External links
 

The Ultimate Fighter winners
American male mixed martial artists
Mixed martial artists from Nevada
Mixed martial artists from Arizona
Light heavyweight mixed martial artists
Mixed martial artists utilizing collegiate wrestling
Mixed martial artists utilizing Brazilian jiu-jitsu
Ultimate Fighting Championship male fighters
Living people
1983 births
Arizona State University alumni
American male sport wrestlers
Amateur wrestlers
American practitioners of Brazilian jiu-jitsu
People awarded a black belt in Brazilian jiu-jitsu
Bellator MMA champions
Bellator male fighters